Chris Crosby may refer to:

 Chris Crosby (singer) (born 1950s), American singer
 Chris Crosby (comics) (born 1977), co-founder of Keenspot